Eggnog, historically also known as a milk punch or an egg milk punch when alcoholic beverages are added, is a rich, chilled, sweetened, dairy-based beverage.  It is traditionally made with milk, cream, sugar, egg yolks, and whipped egg whites (which gives it a frothy texture, and its name). Distilled spirits such as brandy, rum, whisky or bourbon are often a key ingredient.

Throughout Canada, the United States and some European countries, eggnog is traditionally consumed over the Christmas season, from late October until the end of the holiday season. A variety called ponche crema has been made and consumed in Venezuela and Trinidad since the 1900s, also as part of the Christmas season. During that time, commercially prepared eggnog is sold in grocery stores in these countries.

Eggnog is also homemade using milk, eggs, sugar, and flavorings, and served with cinnamon or nutmeg. While eggnog is often served chilled, in some cases it is warmed, particularly on cold days (similar to the way mulled wine is served warm). Eggnog or eggnog flavoring may also be used in other drinks, such as coffee (e.g., an "eggnog latte" espresso drink) and tea, or to dessert foods such as egg-custard puddings.

Terminology

The Modern Bartender's Guide  from 1878 lists many variant names for the drink. It distinguishes "plain eggnog," "egg milk punch," and "milk punch" from one another. It also includes variants such as "Baltimore eggnog," "General Jackson eggnog," "Imperial eggnog," two types of "sherry cobbler eggnog," as well as "sherry cobbler with egg," "mulled claret with egg," "egg sour," and "Saratoga egg lemonade" (also called "sea breeze").

History

Etymology and origins
The origins, etymology, and the ingredients used to make original eggnog drinks are debated. According to the Oxford English Dictionary, nog was "a kind of strong beer brewed in East Anglia". The first known use of the word "nog" was in 1693. Alternatively, nog may stem from noggin, a Middle English term for a small, carved wooden mug used to serve alcohol. Posset, a curdled beverage of milk and either wine or ale was a popular beverage in Britain that may have been a precursor to eggnog. Some monks would add eggs and figs to posset. However, the British drink was also called an egg flip, from the practice of "flipping" (rapidly pouring) the mixture between two pitchers to mix it. One dictionary lists the word "eggnog" as being an Americanism invented in 1765–75.

Babson College professor Frederick Douglass Opie wrote that the term is a combination of two colonial slang words—rum was referred to as grog and bartenders served it in small wooden mugs called noggins. The drink first became known as egg-n-grog and later as eggnog. Ben Zimmer, executive editor for Vocabulary.com, disputes the "egg-n-grog" theory as lacking proof; Zimmer states that the term "nog" may be related to the "Scottish term nugg or nugged ale, meaning "ale warmed with a hot poker."

The Online Etymology Dictionary states that the term "eggnog" is an American term introduced in 1775, consisting of the words "egg" and "nog", with "nog" meaning "strong ale". The first example of the term "eggnog" was in 1775, when Maryland clergyman and philologist Jonathan Boucher wrote a poem about the drink which was not published until 30 years after his death: "Fog-drams i' th' morn, or (better still) egg-nogg, / At night hot-suppings, and at mid-day, grogg, / My palate can regale". The first printed use of the term appeared in the New-Jersey Journal of March 26, 1788, which referred to a young man drinking a glass of eggnog. An 1869 dictionary entry for "eggnog" defines it as a mixture of wine, spirits, eggs and sugar; there is no mention of dairy products.

"While culinary historians debate its exact lineage, most agree eggnog originated from the early medieval" British drink called posset, which was made with hot milk that was curdled with wine or ale and flavored with spices. In the Middle Ages, posset was used as a cold and flu remedy. Posset was popular from medieval times to the 19th century. Eggs were added to some posset recipes; according to Time magazine, by the "13th century, monks were known to drink a posset with eggs and figs." A 17th century recipe for "My Lord of Carlisle’s Sack-Posset" uses a heated mixture of cream, whole cinnamon, mace, nutmeg, eighteen egg yolks, eight egg whites, and one pint of Sack wine (a fortified white wine related to sherry). At the end, sugar, ambergris and animal musk are stirred in. Posset was traditionally served in two-handled pots. The aristocracy had costly posset pots made from silver.

Eggnog is not the only mixed, sweetened alcohol drink associated with the winter season. Mulled wine or wassail is a drink made by Ancient Greeks and Romans with sweetened, spiced wine. When the drink spread to Britain, the locals switched to the more widely available alcohol, hard cider, to make their mulled beverages. During the Victorian era, Britons drank purl, "a heady mixture of gin, warm beer, sugar, bitter herbs, and spices". In the Colonial era in America, the drink was transformed into an "ale-and-rum-based flip" warmed with a hot poker.

Development

In Britain, the drink was originally popular among the aristocracy. "Milk, eggs, and sherry were foods of the wealthy, so eggnog was often used in toasts to prosperity and good health." Those who could afford milk and eggs and costly spirits mixed the eggnog with brandy, Madeira wine or sherry to make a drink similar to modern alcoholic eggnog.

The drink crossed the Atlantic to the British colonies during the 18th century. Since brandy and wine were heavily taxed, rum from the Atlantic slave trade with the Caribbean was a cost-effective substitute. The inexpensive liquor, coupled with plentiful farm and dairy products available to colonists, helped the drink become very popular in America. When the supply of rum to the newly founded United States was reduced as a consequence of the American Revolutionary War, Americans turned to domestic whiskey, and eventually bourbon in particular, as a substitute. In places in the American colonies where even bourbon was too expensive, homemade moonshine spirits were added to eggnog. Eggnog "became tied to the holidays" when it was adopted in the United States in the 1700s. Eggnog "seems to have been popular on both sides of the Atlantic" in the 18th century.

Records show that the first US president, George Washington, "served an eggnog-like drink to visitors" which included "rye whiskey, rum, and sherry." The President's recipe called for a variety of alcoholic beverages along with the dairy and egg ingredients: "One quart cream, one quart milk, one dozen tablespoons sugar, one pint brandy, 1/2 pint rye whiskey, 1/2 pint Jamaica rum, [and] 1/4 pint sherry." The recipe instructs cooks to "mix [the] liquor first, then separate yolks and whites of eggs, add sugar to beaten yolks, mix well. Add milk and cream, slowly beating. Beat whites of eggs until stiff and fold slowly into mixture. Let set in cool place for several days. Taste frequently." The receipt did not specify the number of eggs to use, however modern chefs estimate approximately one dozen.

"Tom and Jerry is a form of hot eggnog [cocktail] that was once popular." The Tom and Jerry was invented by British journalist Pierce Egan in the 1820s, using brandy and rum added to eggnog and served hot, usually in a mug or a bowl. It is a traditional Christmastime cocktail in the United States.

Isaac Weld, Junior, in his book Travels Through the States of North America and the Provinces of Upper and Lower Canada, during the years 1795, 1796, and 1797 (published in 1800) wrote: "The American travelers, before they pursued their journey, took a hearty draught each, according to custom, of egg-nog, a mixture composed of new milk, eggs, rum, and sugar, beat up together". In a similar way to how posset was drunk as a cold remedy in the Medieval era, there is evidence that eggnog was also used as a medical treatment. An 1892 scientific journal article proposes the use of eggnog to treat "grippe", commonly known as the "flu", along with ammonium chloride to treat the cough and quinine to cure the illness.

In the American South, eggnog is made with bourbon. Eggnog is called "coquito" in Puerto Rico, where rum and fresh coconut juice or coconut milk are used in its preparation. Mexican eggnog, also known as "rompope", was developed in Santa Clara. It differs from regular eggnog in its use of Mexican cinnamon and rum or grain alcohol.  In Peru, eggnog is called "biblia con pisco", and it is made with a Peruvian pomace brandy called pisco. German eggnog, called "biersuppe", is made with beer. "Eierpunsch" is a German version of eggnog made with white wine, eggs, sugar, cloves, tea, lemon or lime juice and cinnamon. Another recipe dating from 1904 calls for eggs, lemon juice, sugar, white wine, water and rum. In Iceland, eggnog "is served hot as a dessert."

Ingredients and serving style

Homemade
Traditional homemade eggnog is made of milk or cream, sugar, raw eggs, one or more alcoholic spirits, and spices, often vanilla or nutmeg and in some recipes, cloves. Some recipes call for the eggs to be separated so that the egg whites can be whipped until they are thick; this gives the drink a frothy texture.  American food show presenter Alton Brown points out that based on its ingredients, eggnog is "almost identical to ice cream. It is technically just a stirred custard made of milk and egg".  Homemade recipes may use vanilla ice cream blended into the beverage, particularly when the goal is to create a chilled drink. Some recipes call for condensed milk or evaporated milk in addition to milk and cream. Acidophilus milk, a fermented milk product, has been used to make eggnog. While some recipes call for unwhipped heavy cream, in some recipes, whipped cream is added to the mixture, which gives it a frothier texture. Various sweeteners are used, such as white sugar, brown sugar and maple syrup.

There are variations in ingredients in different recipes.  Traditional eggnog has a significant fat content, due to the use of cream, and a high sugar content. Ingredients vary significantly between different recipes. Alcohol used in different national and regional versions of eggnog include brandy, cognac, bourbon, whiskey, sherry, rum and grain alcohol. Canadian chef Heidi Fink states that one of the reasons people are making less homemade eggnog is that the beverage is expensive to make, due to its use of substantial quantities of cream, eggs, and spirits. Concerns about the safety of raw eggs may be another reason for the decline in homemade eggnog making.

Commercially prepared
Modern commercial eggnog manufacturers add gelatin and other thickeners, a cost-savings measure that enables manufacturers to produce a thick beverage while using less egg and cream. "Commercial eggnog tends to contain less eggs than homemade nog". In the US, FDA regulations only require that 1.0 percent of a product's final weight be made up of egg yolk solids for it to bear the eggnog name. Under current U.S. law, commercial products sold as eggnog are permitted to contain milk, sugar, modified milk ingredients, glucose-fructose, water, carrageenan, guar gum, natural and artificial flavorings, spices, monoglycerides, and colorings. In Canada, the National Dairy Code defines eggnog as: "food made from milk and cream containing milk and cream which has been flavored and sweetened. The food shall contain not less than 3.25 per cent milk fat and not less than 23 per cent total solids." In Canada, if a commercial product does not contain eggs, it cannot be called "eggnog".

Ready-made eggnog versions are seasonally available with different spirits, or without alcohol, to be drunk as bought or used as "mixes" with all the ingredients except the liquor, to be added as desired. While eggnog is mostly available from American Thanksgiving through to Christmas, in some regions a marshmallow-flavoured version is sold at Easter. In the 2000s, low-fat and sugar-free commercial versions are available using sugar substitutes and skimmed or low fat milk.

The Dutch liqueur advocaat, with around 20% alcohol, and German Eierlikör, are essentially an eggnog, although the former only tends to have a similar consistency to eggnog in export markets, where it is sometimes used to make the snowball cocktail. In the Netherlands, advocaat is normally available as a thick and creamy confection which is either consumed as is or used as a cream for various desserts.

Non-dairy and vegan versions

Some North American manufacturers offer soy-, almond-, rice- or coconut milk-based alternatives for vegans and those with dairy allergies, lactose intolerance or other dietary restrictions. The history of non-dairy eggnogs goes back to 1899 when Almeda Lambert, in her Guide for Nut Cookery, gave a recipe for "Eggnog" made using coconut cream, eggs, and sugar. In 1973, Eunice Farmilant, in The Natural Foods Sweet-Tooth Cookbook, gave a more modern non-dairy eggnog recipe.

In 1981, Grain Country of Los Angeles, California, introduced Grain Nog, the earliest non-dairy and vegan eggnog. Vegan means that a food contains no animal products, including milk or eggs. Based on amazake (a traditional Japanese fermented rice beverage) and containing no eggs, Grain Nog was available in plain, strawberry, and carob flavors. Also in 1981, Redwood Valley Soyfoods Unlimited (California) introduced "Soynog", the earliest soy-based non-dairy and vegan eggnog based on soy milk and tofu (added for thickness). It was renamed Lite Nog in 1982 and Tofu Nog in 1985.

Serving and presentation
Whether homemade or commercial eggnog is being served, toppings may be added, such as grated nutmeg or ground cinnamon, whipped cream, a cinnamon stick, chocolate shavings or a vanilla pod. Eggnog can be served in glasses, mugs or stemmed brandy snifters. Eggnog may be served to guests already poured into a glass or other container, or it may be served in a punch bowl, so that guests can serve themselves. Both homemade and commercial eggnogs are made in alcohol-free versions and recipes in which alcoholic beverages, generally brown, aged spirits such as bourbon, brandy or rum are added during preparation or directly to the cup after the nog is poured. For example, for rum, some recipes specify dark rum or spiced rum, for extra flavor. A few recipes suggest Baileys Irish Cream liqueur, apple brandy or even Guinness stout as the alcohol.

Use as flavoring
The distinctive spices that give eggnog its characteristic taste, including cinnamon, nutmeg, and vanilla, are used to create eggnog-flavored foods and beverages. Eggnog-flavored foods include eggnog ice cream, pie, cupcakes, rum cake, cookies, biscotti, pancake syrup, bread pudding, French toast and waffles. Eggnog-flavored beverages include eggnog lattes (developed by Starbucks in the mid-1980s), eggnog-flavored coffee and tea, some craft beers (e.g., eggnog stout) and eggnog milkshakes.

Health and safety

Raw eggs
Most homemade eggnog recipes have historically included raw eggs. While the alcohol added to many homemade eggnogs is a bactericide, eggnog freshly made from raw eggs that are infected with salmonella and not heated can cause food poisoning. A very small percentage of raw eggs are infected with salmonella. In 1981 most of the residents and staff of a nursing home in the U.S. became ill with salmonellosis, and four died. The cause was almost certainly an eggnog made on the spur of the moment, with some cases caused in a secondary outbreak caused by food being handled later by people with contaminated hands. A later publication of the U.S. Food and Drug Administration (FDA) stated that the alcohol in eggnog is not sufficient to sterilize contaminated eggs. Using commercial pasteurized eggs or heating the milk-egg mixture sufficiently can make the drink safe; one recipe calls for heating the mixture gently, without boiling, until it thickens enough to "coat the back of a spoon."

However, aged alcoholic eggnog becomes sterilized even if made with contaminated eggs. Aging alcoholic eggnog—sometimes for as long as a year—has been said to improve its flavor significantly, and also destroys pathogens. The Rockefeller University Laboratory of Bacterial Pathogenesis and Immunology carried out an experiment in 2010 where salmonella was added to a strong eggnog which was refrigerated and stored; the beverage still had dangerous levels of salmonella a week later, but it was all gone within three weeks. A concentration of at least 20% of alcohol (about the same amounts of alcoholic spirits and milk or cream), and refrigeration are recommended for safety.

For concerns about the safety of selling products made from raw eggs and milk, the U.S. FDA has changed or altered the definition of eggnog a number of times towards artificial replacements for the large number of eggs traditionally used. FDA regulations require eggnog to contain at least 1% egg yolk solids and at least 8.25% milk solids. Some recipes for homemade eggnog call for egg yolks to be cooked with milk into a custard to avoid potential hazards from raw eggs.

Alcohol content

TIME magazine states that individuals should be aware of the alcohol content of eggnog, from a responsible drinking perspective. When people make homemade alcoholic eggnog, or when they add spirits to commercially prepared eggnog, in some cases, the drink has a very high alcohol content; one columnist states that in his family Christmas tradition, "it's not eggnog unless you can set fire to it", due to high alcohol percentage. Jazz composer Charles Mingus had an eggnog recipe that contained enough alcohol, including 151 proof rum, to "put down an elephant".

There is a long history of heavily alcohol-spiked eggnog. An 1894 book by a North Carolina traveler describes using  "half gallon of brandy for an eggnog". CNN states that some 19th century American eggnog recipes called for significant amounts of alcohol; one recipe "calls for three dozen eggs, half a gallon of domestic brandy, and another half-pint of French brandy." The high alcohol content of traditional "eggnog inevitably led to problems. In 19th-century Baltimore, it was a custom for young men of the town to go from house to house on New Year’s Day, toasting their hosts in eggnog along the way. The challenge: to finish one’s rounds still standing."

In 2015, controversy arose over a Bloomingdale's advertisement which referred to adding alcohol to eggnog. The ad depicted a man and a woman, with the woman looking away from the man, and it was captioned "Spike your best friend’s eggnog when they’re not looking". After being widely criticized on social media websites such as Twitter as seemingly endorsing date rape and alcohol-facilitated sexual assault, Bloomingdales responded with an apology: "In reflection of recent feedback, the copy we used in our recent catalog was inappropriate and in poor taste. Bloomingdale’s sincerely apologizes for this error in judgment."

The most notable case of alcohol problems associated with the drink was the Eggnog Riot at the United States Military Academy in West Point, New York, on 23–25 December 1826. Alcohol possession at the academy was prohibited, along with drunkenness and intoxication, both of which could lead to expulsion. By 1826, concern had been raised that drinking was starting to get out of hand among the 260 cadets at the academy. The cadets were informed that, due to the alcohol prohibition on the site, their Christmas eggnog would be alcohol-free, prompting the decision by cadets to smuggle liquor into the academy. Gallons of whiskey were smuggled into the barracks to make eggnog for a Christmas Day party. This led to "a drunken free-for-all. Windows, furniture, and crockery were smashed; banisters were torn from walls, fights broke out. One eggnog-addled cadet tried, but failed, to shoot his commanding officer." The incident resulted in the court-martialing of twenty cadets and one enlisted soldier. Neither the young Jefferson Davis nor Robert E. Lee, who were in attendance, was found guilty of any offences or expelled.

Nutritional aspects
According to the USDA, a one cup (250 ml) serving of eggnog contains  (17% of a typical person's daily value of food energy); 34.4 grams of carbohydrates (11% of DV), including 21.4 grams of sugar; 19 grams of fat (29% of DV); and 9.7 grams of protein (19% of DV). TIME magazine's Tristan Stephenson states that eggnog's "alcohol and sugar provide energy, eggs supply protein, and the fat from the milk or cream gives the [wintertime] drinker the necessary "layers" to deal with the frost." TIME magazine also states that with its cream, eggs and sugar ingredients, "eggnog can pack in upwards of 400 [kilocalories; 1700 kJ] per cup." CNN states that a "...relatively small four-ounce [120 mL] cup of store-bought eggnog boasts a whopping  (half of them from fat), nearly 10 grams of fat, and over 70 mg of cholesterol...[, which is] around a quarter of your recommended daily intake of cholesterol." National Geographic writer Rebecca Rupp states that with eggnog's saturated fat, cholesterol, liquor and high calorie count, "...[t]here's no way this stuff is good for us." Esquire states that "[e]ggnog is irredeemable from a nutritional standpoint. Period. The pre-packaged stuff is mostly made from high-fructose corn syrup, dairy fat, and a bunch of unlovable additives" and it recommends a "two-drink maximum" for health reasons.

Reception and consumption

Eggnog has a polarized reception from food critics, chefs and consumers; Esquire states that "there doesn't seem to be a middle ground on eggnog. You either love it or hate it". While some are enthusiastic advocates of the beverage, others are critical of its taste or consistency. The CBC stated that the "ancient drink can be quite divisive." The Guardian writer Andrew Shanahan described eggnog in a critical manner in 2006: "People rarely get it right, but even if you do it still tastes horrible. The smell is like an omelet and the consistency defies belief. It lurches around the glass like partially-sentient sludge."

TIME magazine's Tristan Stephenson states that eggnog is popular because it "[t]ick[s] every single one of the guilt/pleasure boxes, on account of being little more than fat, sugar, and alcohol", which makes it "so ludicrously delicious", a sort of "alcoholic custard". The New Yorker writer Carmen Maria Machado described an anti-eggnog article in the Times as a "buzzkill" for providing the drink's calorie count; Machado argues that "[e]ggnog’s decadence should not be considered sinful; indeed, it is one of those foods whose low-fat variations I believe to be a kind of crime."

Canadian chef Heidi Fink, from Victoria, praises homemade nog but criticizes the "slimy" "glop you can buy in supermarkets". Chowhound criticized Trader Joe's chocolate-flavored eggnog, calling it "ghastly".  The New York Daily News argued against the use of eggnog flavoring (and other flavors, like blueberry) in coffee, calling the results "Franken-coffee".

Consumption in the United States in 2019 was 53.5 million bottles purchased and Americans spent $185 million on eggnog. The consumption of egg nog was down 42 percent since 1969.

The drink is more popular in the United States in the 2000s than the United Kingdom, despite the fact that it was developed in Britain and then transplanted to the American colonies in the 1700s. As of 2014, Canadians are drinking less store-bought eggnog. They drank 5.3 million liters of commercial eggnog in 2014's Christmas period; this is less than in 1994, when they drank eight million liters. Some of the possible reasons for the decline in Canadian eggnog consumption could be concerns about raw eggs (for homemade eggnog) and health concerns, regarding the fat and sugar content of the drink.

See also

 
 
 
 
 
 
 
 List of egg drinks

References

Cited books
 Agnew, James B. (1979). Eggnog Riot. San Rafael, CA: Presidio Press.

Further reading

 Rombauer, Irma S. and Marion Rombauer Becker (1931 [1964]) The Joy of Cooking, pp 48, 50. Indianapolis: Bobbs-Merrill. .

Alcoholic drinks
British drinks
Christmas food
Cold drinks
Eggs (food)
Eggs in culture
Historical drinks
Hot drinks
Milk-based drinks
Mixed drinks
New Year foods
Cocktails with eggs
Thanksgiving food